Uncle Joe's Mint Balls are mints produced by William Santus & Co. Ltd. in Wigan, Greater Manchester, England since 1898. Despite their name, the mints are not truly spherical but oblate spheroids. The ingredients of Uncle Joe's Mint Balls are pure cane sugar, oil of peppermint and cream of tartar and are described on the tin as "suitable for vegans".

As of 2011, 160,000 mint balls are made per day, which is around 35 million per year.

The early mint balls were made by William Santus' wife, Ellen, before production moved to a factory near Wigan Wallgate railway station in 1919.

The packaging, usually a sealed can, carries a picture of the mascot, a smiling man in a top hat.

In popular culture
Singer/songwriter and humorist Mike Harding has a song called "Uncle Joe's Mint Balls" on his 1975 album Mrs. 'Ardin's Kid. It also appeared as the B-side to his 1975 single "My Brother Sylveste". 
The local rugby team, Wigan Warriors have a version of the song celebrating some of its legendary rugby players of the 1950s and 60s such as Billy Boston, Brian McTigue and Eric Ashton that plays before some of its home games at the DW Stadium. 
The comic magazine Viz made a strip called 'Uncle Joe's Mint Balls' which was about Joseph Stalin, who was sometimes called 'Uncle Joe' by Western media, and his quest to show off his untarnished testicles to the world's press (such testicles would be known as 'mint balls' in the vernacular of Northern England, where the comic is printed.)
Oscar winning blockbuster 'As Good as it Gets' starring Helen Hunt and Jack Nicolson includes a scene with Uncle Joe's mint balls on the table.

See also
 List of confectionery brands

References

External links 
 Official site

Brand name confectionery
British confectionery
Companies based in Wigan